Nathan James Decalvia Ferguson (born 12 October 1995) is an English professional footballer who plays for  club Wealdstone. He can play as a midfielder or a forward.

He spent his youth in the academies at Norwich City and Dagenham & Redbridge. He then spent the early part of his career moving between various clubs in the Southern League, Isthmian League and National League, including: Chelmsford City, St Albans City, Hastings United, Billericay Town, Grays Athletic, Dartford, Southport, Bromley and Folkestone Invicta. He also had two brief and unsuccessful spells in the English Football League with Burton Albion and Port Vale. He finally established himself at Dulwich Hamlet, and helped the club to win promotion out of the Isthmian League Premier Division at the end of the 2017–18 season. He earned a move to League Two club Crawley Town in June 2019 and changed clubs to Southend United 18 months later. He signed with National League side Wealdstone in February 2022.

Career

Early career

Ferguson started his career in Norwich City in their youth academy. He then transferred to Dagenham & Redbridge and joined their senior team. His goal against Gillingham Academy on 3 November 2012 was nominated for the November Football League Academy goal of the month competition. 

On 14 August 2013, he joined Conference South club Chelmsford City on a one-month loan deal. He made his debut in senior football for the "Clarets", coming on as a 68th-minute substitute for Tom Derry in a 2–1 defeat at Tonbridge Angels, in what would be his only appearance for the club.  On 20 December 2013, he joined St Albans City on a one-month loan. He played four Southern League Premier games for the "Saints". He ended the 2013–14 season at Isthmian League Division One South club Hastings United, though would score an own goal in extra-time to gift Folkestone Invicta a 3–2 victory in the play-off semi-finals at Cheriton Road after he attempted to block a pass only to see the ball loop over his own keeper's head from 30-yards out.

After being released by the "Daggers", he signed for Billericay Town of the Isthmian League Premier Division in September 2014. He was used as a winger by manager Craig Edwards, but lost his first team place after picking up a hamstring injury. He signed for league rivals Grays Athletic in February 2015, in hope of more regular football. He helped the "Grays" to lose just one of their final 14 matches of the season, which left the club just one point outside the play-offs. He also played in the Isthmian League Cup final, which ended in a 3–2 defeat to Hendon. He impressed for the "Gravelmen", and praised managers Glen Little and Mark Bentley for allowing him the freedom to express himself. The club reported that Fleetwood Town made an illegal approach for the player in October 2015.

Burton Albion 
Ferguson signed a two-and-a-half-year deal with League One side Burton Albion on 2 December 2015 after impressing manager Jimmy Floyd Hasselbaink on trial. In doing so he went against the advice of Grays manager Mark Bentley, who said that he should see out the season with Grays Athletic, saying that "sitting in U21 sides is not what they [Ferguson and Dumebi Dumaka] need". Nigel Clough replaced Hasselbaink as "Brewers" boss just two days later, and Ferguson failed to make an appearance at the Pirelli Stadium. 

He was loaned to Dartford on 24 March 2016. He played seven National League South games for the "Darts", and scored the winning goal in a 2–1 victory over Maidstone United at the Gallagher Stadium on 9 April. He also played in the final of the Kent Senior Cup, where Dartford beat Charlton Athletic 3–1.

Port Vale 
On 26 July 2016, Ferguson signed a one-year contract with Port Vale, becoming manager Bruno Ribeiro's 13th signing of the summer. He made his first and only appearance for the "Valiants" as a first-half substitute in an EFL Trophy match against Derby County Under 23s at Vale Park on 30 August. 

On 8 October, he joined National League side Southport on a month-long loan. He played seven games for Steve Burr's "Sandgrounders". Ferguson left Vale by mutual consent on 30 January 2017 after coming to an agreement with new boss Michael Brown on the remainder of his contract.

Bromley to Dulwich
Ferguson returned to the National League, signing with Bromley in March 2017. However his only appearance for the "Ravens" came in the Kent Senior Cup. He signed on loan for Folkestone Invicta towards the end of the 2016–17 season. He featured in three Isthmian League Premier Division games for the "Seasiders", scoring one goal. 

He signed for Dulwich Hamlet on 1 July 2017. He scored seven goals from 52 appearances in the 2017–18 season, and played in the play-off final victory over Hendon that secured the club promotion out of the Isthmian League. He remained a key player at Champion Hill in the National League South, scoring three goals from 39 games in the 2018–19 campaign.

Crawley Town 
On 14 June 2019, Ferguson signed for League Two club Crawley Town on a three-year-deal for an undisclosed fee. On 3 August, he made his professional debut, playing the full 90 minutes away to Carlisle United. He scored his first goal for the "Red Devils" seven days later, in a 2–0 victory against Salford City at Broadfield Stadium. On 24 September, he scored the equalizing goal in a 1–1 draw with Stoke City in the EFL Cup, before Crawley won the tie on penalties. He maintained his first-team place after John Yems replaced Gabriele Cioffi as manager in December and totaled six goals in 39 appearances throughout the truncated 2019–20 season.

Southend United
On 29 January 2021, he signed for Southend United for an undisclosed fee on a 18-month contract with the option of a further year. He scored his first goal for Southend on his debut the following day in a 5–1 defeat at former club Port Vale, after coming on as a substitute. Manager Mark Molesley described his debut goal as the only positive of the match. On 24 February, he scored a 'sensational' goal from 40-yards in a 3–1 win at Forest Green Rovers. Former manager Phil Brown returned to the club in April but he could not help Southend to avoid relegation out of the Football League at the end of the 2020–21 season. He made 24 appearances in the first half of the 2021–22 season before his contract was mutually terminated on 3 February 2022.

Wealdstone
On 4 February 2022, Ferguson joined National League club Wealdstone on a free transfer. He made his debut four days for the "Stones" later in a 2–1 victory against Yeovil Town at Grosvenor Vale, and then scored his first Wealdstone goal on 12 February, in a 3–1 win over local rivals Barnet.

Style of play
Ferguson is able to play as a midfielder or forward and has pace, power and skill.

Career statistics

Notes

Honours
Grays Athletic
Isthmian League Cup runner-up: 2015

Dartford
Kent Senior Cup: 2016

Dulwich Hamlet
Isthmian League Premier Division play-offs: 2018

References

1995 births
Living people
Black British sportsmen
Footballers from Walthamstow
English footballers
Association football midfielders
Association football forwards
Norwich City F.C. players
Dagenham & Redbridge F.C. players
Chelmsford City F.C. players
St Albans City F.C. players
Hastings United F.C. players
Billericay Town F.C. players
Grays Athletic F.C. players
Burton Albion F.C. players
Dartford F.C. players
Port Vale F.C. players
Southport F.C. players
Bromley F.C. players
Folkestone Invicta F.C. players
Dulwich Hamlet F.C. players
Crawley Town F.C. players
Southend United F.C. players
Wealdstone F.C. players
National League (English football) players
Southern Football League players
Isthmian League players
English Football League players